The 2015 Vanderbilt Commodores baseball team represented Vanderbilt University during the 2015 NCAA Division I baseball season. The Commodores played their home games at Hawkins Field as a member of the Southeastern Conference. They were led by head coach Tim Corbin, in his 13th season at Vanderbilt.

Previous season
In 2014, the Commodores finished the season 3rd in the SEC's Eastern Division with a record of 47–19, 17–13 in conference play. They qualified for the 2014 Southeastern Conference baseball tournament and were eliminated in the second round. They qualified for the 2014 NCAA Division I baseball tournament, and were selected to host the Nashville Regional, which included Oregon, Clemson, and Xavier. The Commodores won their first three games of the regional, defeating Xavier by a score of 11–0, Oregon by a score of 7–2, and Oregon again, this time, 3–2, to advance to the Super Regional, of which they were hosts. In their first game against Stanford, the Commodores won 11–6, before dropping the second game, 4–5. In game three, Vanderbilt won, 12–5, to advance to the College World Series.

In the College World Series, Vanderbilt defeated Louisville and UC Irvine to advance to the semifinals and play Texas. In the first match-up with the Longhorns, the Commodores dropped their first game of the College World Series, losing 0–4. In the second game, the Commodores won 4–3 in ten innings, advancing to the College World Series finals to play Virginia.

Vanderbilt opened the finals against Virginia, the #3 national seed in the tournament, with a 9–8 victory. The Commodores proceeded to drop the second game, 2–7, before winning game three, 3–2. Vanderbilt were crowned national champions, their first championship in program history.

2015 regular season

After a slow start, the Commodores easily qualified for the 2015 Southeastern Conference tournament, where they finished second to the Florida Gators.  They then played host to the 2015 NCAA Nashville Regional, where they defeated Lipscomb University, The University of Indiana and Radford University, the last opponent by a record-tying shutout score of 21–0. The Commodores then faced the University of Illinois in the NCAA Superegional, defeating them in a two-game sweep and advancing to the College World Series.

In 65 games in his junior year for the team, Rhett Wiseman hit .318/.419/.566 with 66 runs (2nd in the Southeastern Conference), 39 walks (tied for 6th), and 14 home runs (tied for 6th).  He was named an All-American.

2015 NCAA College World Series

In their opening-round game in the 2015 College World Series, Vanderbilt defeated , 4–3, on a walkoff home run in the bottom of the ninth in a game that had been suspended due to rain the night before, advancing into the winners' bracket. In their second-round game, Vanderbilt defeated the number 7 national seed TCU, 1–0. Zander Wiel hit a home run in the 7th inning to score the lone run of the game and break up a no-hitter.

Behind an offensive outburst and dominating performance behind the arm of Walker Buehler, the Commodores beat TCU 7–1 to advance to their second straight College World Series Championship Series. Commodores outfielder Rhett Wiseman was hit in his neck by an 89 mph fastball while batting during the game, and was hit so hard it left a red mark that even showed the outlines of the baseball's laces on his neck. He stayed in the game (telling their coach "it's the College World Series, baby. You're not taking me out of this game"). Wiseman went on to hit a home run innings later.

In game 1 of the championship series Vanderbilt defeated Virginia 5–1 thanks to an outing by Carson Fulmer. Virginia held Vanderbilt scoreless (3–0) for just the second time all year, forcing a winner-take-all third game for the national championship. The Cavaliers beat Vanderbilt 4–2 to win their first baseball national championship in program history.

Personnel

Roster

Coaching staff

Schedule

! style="" | Regular Season
|- valign="top"

|- bgcolor="#bbffbb"
| February 13 ||  || #1 || Hawkins Field • Nashville, TN || 4–0 || Fulmer (1–0) || Steffens (0–1) ||  || 2,958 || 1–0 ||
|- bgcolor="#ffbbbb"
| February 14 || Santa Clara || #1 || Hawkins Field • Nashville, TN || 6–7 || Karalus (1–0) || Stone (0–1) ||  || 2,754 || 1–1 ||
|- bgcolor="#bbffbb"
| February 14 || Santa Clara || #1 || Hawkins Field • Nashville, TN || 6–5 (10) || Sheffield (1–0) || Karalus (1–1) ||  || 2,754 || 2–1 ||
|- bgcolor="#bbbbbb"
| February 18 || at  || #2 || E. S. Rose Park • Nashville, TN || colspan=7| Postponed Rescheduled for April 28
|- bgcolor="#bbffbb"
| February 20 || vs.  || #2 || Charlotte Sports Park • Port Charlotte, FL || 3–2 || Bowden (1–0) || Keaffaber (0–1) ||  || NA || 3–1 ||
|- bgcolor="#ffbbbb"
| February 21 || vs. Indiana State || #2 || Charlotte Sports Park • Port Charlotte, FL || 1–8 || Degano (2–0) || Stone (0–2) ||  || NA || 3–2 ||
|- bgcolor="#bbffbb"
| February 22 || vs. Indiana State || #2 || Charlotte Sports Park • Port Charlotte, FL || 6–0 || Wright (1–0) || Kuhlman (0–2) ||  || NA || 4–2 ||
|- bgcolor="#bbffbb"
| February 24 ||  || #4 || Hawkins Field • Nashville, TN || 16–3  || Shaw (1–2)  || Shaw (0–1) ||  || 2,365 || 5–2 ||
|- bgcolor="#bbffbb"
| February 25 ||  || #4 || Hawkins Field • Nashville, TN || 10–6 ||Pfeifer (1–0)  || Pearson (0–2) ||  || 2,405 || 6–2 ||
|- bgcolor="#bbffbb"
| February 27 ||  || #4 || Hawkins Field • Nashville, TN || 16–1 || Fulmer (2–0) || Headean (1–1) ||  || 2,409 || 7–2 ||
|- bgcolor="#bbffbb"
| February 28 || Illinois State || #4 || Hawkins Field • Nashville, TN || 3–2 || Kilichowski (1–0) || Hendren (1–1) ||  || 2,502 || 8–2 ||
|-

|- bgcolor="#bbffbb"
| March 1 || Illinois State || #4 || Hawkins Field • Nashville, TN || 16–10 || Bowden (2–0)  || Heilenbach (0–1) ||  || 2,758 || 9–2 ||
|- bgcolor="#bbffbb"
| March 3 ||  || #4 || Hawkins Field • Nashville, TN || 9–8 (12) || Sheffield (2–0) || Gould (0–1) ||  || 2,376 || 10–2 ||
|- bgcolor="#bbffbb"
| March 6 || at #7 UCLA || #4 || Jackie Robinson Stadium • Los Angeles, CA || 6–0 || Fulmer (3–0) || Kaprielian (3–1) ||  || 2,204 || 11–2 ||
|- bgcolor="#ffbbbb"
| March 7 || at #20  || #4 || Dedeaux Field • Los Angeles, CA || 5–6 || Huberman (3–1) || Bowden (2–1) ||  || 1,401 || 11–3 ||
|- bgcolor="#ffbbbb"
| March 8 || vs. #1 TCU || #4 || Dodger Stadium • Los Angeles, CA || 2–4 || Morrison (3–0) || Pfeifer (1–1) || Ferrell (5) || NA || 11–4 ||
|- bgcolor="#bbffbb"
| March 10 ||  || #7 || Hawkins Field • Nashville, TN || 9–2 || Sheffield (3–0) || Luciani (0–1) ||  || 2,444 || 12–4 ||
|- bgcolor="#bbffbb"
| March 11 || Quinnipiac || #7 || Hawkins Field • Nashville, TN || 8–0 || Johnson (1–0)  || Thomas (1–2) ||  || 2,450 || 13–4 ||
|- bgcolor="#bbffbb"
| March 14 || Arkansas || #7 || Hawkins Field • Nashville, TN || 8–7 (12) || Bowden (3–1)  || Stone (0–2) ||  || 3,040 || 14–4 || 1–0
|- bgcolor="#bbffbb"
| March 14 || Arkansas || #7 || Hawkins Field • Nashville, TN || 9–1 || Buehler (1–0) || Taccolini (0–2) || Kilichowski (1) || 3,040 || 15–4 || 2–0
|- bgcolor="#bbffbb"
| March 15 || Arkansas || #7 || Hawkins Field • Nashville, TN || 1–0 || Pfeifer (2–1) || Alberius (1–2) ||  || 3,150 || 16–4 || 3–0
|- bgcolor="#bbffbb"
| March 17 ||  || #5 || Hawkins Field • Nashville, TN || 9–1 || Johnson (2–0) || Gardner (0–1) ||  || 2,813 || 17–4 ||
|- bgcolor="#ffbbbb"
| March 20 || at #30  || #5 || Plainsman Park • Auburn, AL || 4–6 || Thompson (4–2) || Fulmer (3–1) || Lipscomb (1) || 2,869 || 17–5 || 3–1
|- bgcolor="#bbffbb"
| March 21 || at #30 Auburn || #5 || Plainsman Park • Auburn, AL || 10–5  || Buehler (2–0) || Wingenter (1–2) || Pfeifer (3) ||  || 18–5 || 4–1
|- bgcolor="#bbffbb"
| March 21 || at #30 Auburn || #5 || Plainsman Park • Auburn, AL || 7–6 (10) || Bowden (4–1) || Yarbrough (0–1) ||  || 2,840 || 19–5 || 5–1
|- bgcolor="#bbffbb"
| March 24 || at  || #3 || Reese Smith Jr. Field • Murfreesboro, TN || 12–7 || Wright (2–0) || Alton (3–1) ||  || 2,620 || 20–5 ||
|- bgcolor="#bbffbb"
| March 27 ||  || #3 || Hawkins Field • Nashville, TN || 9–0 || Fulmer (4–1) || Marks (2–3) ||  || 3,409 || 21–5 || 6–1
|- bgcolor="#ffbbbb"
| March 28 || Tennessee || #3 || Hawkins Field • Nashville, TN || 5–9 || Serrano (2–3) || Pfeifer (2–2) ||  || 3,626 ||  21–6 || 6–2
|- bgcolor="#bbffbb"
| March 29 || Tennessee || #3 || Hawkins Field • Nashville, TN || 14–3 || Johnson (3–0) || Martin (1–1) ||  || 3,626 || 22–6 || 7–2
|- bgcolor="#bbffbb"
| March 31 ||  || #3 || Hawkins Field • Nashville, TN || 6–0 || Wright (3–0) || Lance (2–1) ||  || 2,762 || 23–6 ||
|-

|- bgcolor="#bbffbb"
| April 1 || Wofford || #3 || Hawkins Field • Nashville, TN || 5–3 || Kilichowski (2–0) || Accetta (1–2) || Bowden (1) || 2,942 || 24–6 ||
|- bgcolor="#bbffbb"
| April 3 || at  || #3 || Foley Field • Athens, GA || 9–7 || Fulmer (5–1) || McLaughlin (3–2) || Pfeifer (4) || 2,551 || 25–6 || 8–2
|- bgcolor="#bbffbb"
| April 4 || at Georgia || #3 || Foley Field • Athens, GA || 11–7 || Buehler (3–0) || Lawlor (3–4) ||  || 3,162 || 26–6 || 9–2
|- bgcolor="#bbffbb"
| April 5 || at Georgia || #3 || Foley Field • Athens, GA || 4–2 || Wright (4–0) || Tucker (0–1) || Pfeifer (5) || 2,157 || 27–6 || 10–2
|- bgcolor="#ffbbbb"
| April 7 ||  || #2 || Hawkins Field • Nashville, TN || 1–3 || Puckett (2–1) || Kilichowski (2–1) || Andros || 3,060 || 27–7 ||
|- bgcolor="#bbffbb"
| April 9 ||  || #2 || Hawkins Field • Nashville, TN || 6–0 || Fulmer (6–1) || Trent ||  || 3,111 || 28–7 || 11–2
|- bgcolor="#ffbbbb"
| April 10 || Ole Miss || #2 || Hawkins Field • Nashville, TN || 5–6 (16) || Weathersby || Wright (4–1) ||  || 3,540 || 28–8 || 11–3
|- bgcolor="#ffbbbb"
| April 11 || Ole Miss || #2 || Hawkins Field • Nashville, TN || 4–5 || Stokes || Ferguson (0–1) || Waguespack || 3,626 || 28–9 || 11–4
|- bgcolor="#ffbbbb"
| April 14 || Belmont || #7 || Hawkins Field • Nashville, TN || 2–3 || McGrath (4–2) || Sheffield (3–1) || Kinney || 2,886 || 28–10 ||
|- bgcolor="#bbffbb"
| April 16 || at South Carolina || #7 || Carolina Stadium • Columbia, SC || 12–0 || Fulmer (7–1) || Fiori (3–1) ||  || 6,905 || 29–10 || 12–4
|- bgcolor="#ffbbbb"
| April 17 || at South Carolina || #7 || Carolina Stadium • Columbia, SC || 2–5 || Wynkoop || Buehler (3–1) ||  || 7,340 || 29–11 || 12–5
|- bgcolor="#ffbbbb"
| April 18 || at South Carolina || #7 || Carolina Stadium • Columbia, SC || 2–3 || Mincey || Kilichowski (2–2) || Widener (9) || 8,242 || 29–12 || 12–6
|- bgcolor="#bbffbb"
| April 21 || Middle Tennessee || #14 || Hawkins Field • Nashville, TN || 4–0 || Johnson (4–0) || Ring (4–2) || || 2,987 || 30–12 ||
|- bgcolor="#bbffbb"
| April 24 || #15 Missouri || #14 || Hawkins Field • Nashville, TN || 9–2 || Fulmer (8–1) || McClain (5–5) ||  || 3,348 || 31–12 || 13–6
|- bgcolor="#bbffbb"
| April 25 || #15 Missouri || #14 || Hawkins Field • Nashville, TN || 12–2 || Pfeifer (3–2) || Houck (6–3) ||  || 3,424 || 32–12 || 14–6
|- bgcolor="#bbffbb"
| April 26 || #15 Missouri || #14 || Hawkins Field • Nashville, TN || 12–2 || Bowden (5–1) || Tribby (0–3) ||  || 3,496 || 33–12 || 15–6
|- bgcolor="#ffbbbb"
| April 28 || at  || #9 || E. S. Rose Park • Nashville, TN || 1–4 || McGrath || Kilichowski (2–3) || Kinney (5) || 918 || 33–13 ||
|-

|- bgcolor="#bbffbb"
| May 1 || at  || #9 || Cliff Hagan Stadium • Lexington, KY || 13–3 || Fulmer (9–1) || Brown (4–5) ||  || 2,655 || 34–13 || 16–6
|- bgcolor="#ffbbbb"
| May 2 || at Kentucky || #9 || Cliff Hagan Stadium • Lexington, KY || 5–11 || Beggs (7–2) || Pfeifer (3–3) ||  || 2,512 || 34–14 || 16–7
|- bgcolor="#bbffbb"
| May 3 || at Kentucky || #9 || Cliff Hagan Stadium • Lexington, KY || 7–3 || Sheffield (4–1) || Strecker (2–1) || Bowden (2) || 3,043 || 35–14 || 17–7
|- bgcolor="#bbffbb"
| May 7 || #14 Florida || #11 || Hawkins Field • Nashville, TN || 2–0 || Fulmer (10–1) || Shore (6–5) ||  || 3,626 || 36–14 || 18–7
|- bgcolor="#ffbbbb"
| May 8 || #14 Florida || #11 || Hawkins Field • Nashville, TN || 3–7 || Puk (7–3) || Pfeifer (3–4) ||  || 3,626 || 36–15 || 18–8
|- bgcolor="#ffbbbb"
| May 9 || #14 Florida || #11 || Hawkins Field • Nashville, TN || 7–9 || Lewis (4–1) || Sheffield (4–2) ||  || 3,626 || 36–16 || 18–9
|- bgcolor="#bbffbb"
| May 12 || at #3 Louisville || #10 || Jim Patterson Stadium • Louisville, KY || 5–2 || Johnson (5–0) || McClure (1–1) || Kilichowski (2) || 5,042 || 37–16 ||
|- bgcolor="#bbffbb"
| May 14 || at Alabama || #10 || Hoover Metropolitan Stadium • Hoover, AL || 2–1 || Fulmer (11–1) || Guilbeau (2–6) ||  || 2,906 || 38–16 || 19–9
|- bgcolor="#bbffbb"
| May 15 || at Alabama || #10 || Hoover Metropolitan Stadium • Hoover, AL || 7–5 || Sheffield (5–2) || Walter (4–4) || Wright (1) || 3,515 || 39–16 || 20–9
|- bgcolor="#ffbbbb"
| May 16 || at Alabama || #10 || Hoover Metropolitan Stadium • Hoover, AL || 0–1 || Carter (4–5) || Buehler (3–2) || Burrow (6) || 3,684 || 39–17 || 20–10
|-

|-
! style="" | Post-season
|-

|- bgcolor="#ccffcc"
| May 20 || Missouri || #7  || Hoover Metropolitan Stadium • Hoover, AL || 7–6 (10) || Wright (5–1) || Williams (4–4) ||  || 5,205 || 40–17 || 1–0
|- bgcolor="#ffbbbb"
| May 21 || #8  || #7 || Hoover Metropolitan Stadium • Hoover, AL || 6–1 || Kent (7–1) || Fulmer (11–2) ||  || 8,361 || 40–18 || 1–1
|- bgcolor="#ccffcc"
| May 22 || Alabama || #7 || Hoover Metropolitan Stadium • Hoover, AL || 16–1 (7) || Pfeifer (4–4) || Carter (4–6) ||  || 10,329 || 41–18 || 2–1
|- bgcolor="#ccffcc"
| May 23 || #8 Texas A&M|| #7 || Hoover Metropolitan Stadium • Hoover, AL || 12–3 || Kilichowski (3–3) || Vinson 4–2 ||  || 10,949 || 42–18 || 3–1
|- bgcolor="#ffbbbb"
| May 24 || #9 Florida || #7  || Hoover Metropolitan Stadium • Hoover, AL || 7–3 || Young (2–0)  || Johnson (5–1)  ||  || 7,998 || 42–19 || 3–2
|-

|- bgcolor="#ccffcc"
| May 29 || (4)  || Hawkins Field • Nashville, TN || 11–0 || Fulmer (12–2) || Martinez (7–4) || || 3,626 || 43–19 || 1–0
|- bgcolor="#ccffcc"
| May 30 || (3)  || Hawkins Field • Nashville, TN || 6–4 || Bowden (6–1) || Harrison (4–2) || Wright (2) || 3,626 || 44–19 || 2–0
|- bgcolor="#ccffcc"
| June 1 || (2)  || Hawkins Field • Nashville, TN || 21–0 || Buehler (4–2) || MacKeith (7–5) || || 3,626 || 45–19 || 3–0
|-

|- bgcolor="ccffcc"
| June 6 || (6)  || Illinois Field • Champaign, IL || 13–0 || Fulmer (13–2) || Duchene 11–2 || || 3,605 || 46–19 || 4–0
|- bgcolor="ccffcc"
| June 8 || (6) Illinois || Illinois Field • Champaign, IL || 4–2 || Pfeifer (5–4)  || Jay (5–2) || Wright (3) || 3,767 || 47–19 || 5–0
|-

|- bgcolor="ccffcc"
| June 14/15 ||  || TD Ameritrade Park • Omaha, NE || 4–3 || Wright 6–1 || Peitzmeier (5–4)||  || 21,674 || 48–19 ||1–0
|- bgcolor="ccffcc"
| June 16 || (7) TCU || TD Ameritrade Park • Omaha, NE || 1–0 || Pfeifer (6–4) || Young (9–3) || Wright (4) || 24,156 || 49–19 || 2–0
|- bgcolor="ccffcc"
| June 19 || (7) TCU || TD Ameritrade Park • Omaha, NE || 7–1 || Buehler (5–2) || Alexander (6–3) || || 26,011 || 50–19 || 3–0
|- bgcolor="ccffcc"
| June 22 ||  || TD Ameritrade Park • Omaha, NE || 5–1 || Fulmer (14–2) || Jones (7–3) ||  || 21,652 || 51–19 || 4–0
|- bgcolor="ffbbbb"
| June 23 || Virginia || TD Ameritrade Park • Omaha, NE || 0–3 || Sborz (7–2) || Pfeifer (6–5) ||  || 24,645 || 51–20 || 4–1
|- bgcolor="ffbbbb"
| June 24 || Virginia || TD Ameritrade Park • Omaha, NE || 2–4 || Waddell (5–5) || Kilichowski (3–4) || Kirby (1) || 17,689 || 51–21 || 4–2
|-

|-
| style="font-size:88%" | All rankings from Collegiate Baseball.

Rankings

Awards and honors
Carson Fulmer
 Louisville Slugger Pre-season First team All-American
 Perfect Game USA Pre-season First team All-American
 Baseball America Pre-season First team All-American
 SEC Pitcher of the Year
 Won SEC Pitching Triple Crown (Wins, ERA, and Strikeouts)
 Collegiate Baseball First team All-American
 First team All-SEC
 SEC All-Defensive Team
 Golden Spikes Finalist
 Nashville NCAA Regional All-Tournament

Walker Buehler
 Louisville Slugger Pre-season First team All-American
 Perfect Game USA Pre-season First team All-American
 Baseball America Pre-season First team All-American

Dansby Swanson
 Louisville Slugger Pre-season First team All-American
 Perfect Game USA Pre-season First team All-American
 Baseball America Pre-season first-team All-American
 College Baseball second-team All-American
 Second Team All-SEC
 Golden Spikes finalist
 SEC All-Tournament
 MVP of the Nashville NCAA Regional

Zander Wiel
 SEC All-Tournament
 Nashville NCAA Regional All-Tournament

Rhett Wiseman
 Nashville NCAA Regional All-Tournament

Bryan Reynolds
 Louisville Slugger Pre-season Third team All-American
 Perfect Game USA Pre-season Second team All-American
 SEC All-Tournament
 Nashville NCAA Regional All-Tournament

Ro Coleman
 Nashville NCAA Regional All-Tournament

Jeren Kendall
 Freshman All-SEC
 Nashville NCAA Regional All-Tournament

Will Toffey
 Freshman All-SEC

Kyle Wright
 Freshman All-SEC

Commodores in the MLB Draft

References

Vanderbilt Commodores
Vanderbilt Commodores baseball seasons
Vanderbilt Commodores base
Vanderbilt
College World Series seasons